Schocken Books is a book publishing imprint of Penguin Random House that specializes in Jewish literary works. Originally established in 1931 by Salman Schocken as Schocken Verlag in Berlin, the company later moved to Palestine and then the United States, and was acquired by Random House in 1987.

History
Schocken Books was founded in 1931 by Schocken Department Store owner Salman Schocken. Schocken has  published the writings of Martin Buber, Franz Rosenzweig, Franz Kafka and S. Y. Agnon, among others.

After being shut down by the Germans in 1939, Schocken, who immigrated from Germany to Palestine in 1934, founded the Hebrew-language Schocken Publishing House in Mandatory Palestine. Schocken moved to the United States in 1940. In 1945 he founded the English-language Schocken Books in New York City. In 1987 it was bought up by Random House. Schocken Books continues to publish Jewish literary works.

Selected English publications

Franz Kafka
 The Trial
 The Castle
 Amerika
 The Diaries 1910-1923
 Letters to Felice
 Letters to Ottla
 Letters to Milena
 Letters to Family, Friends, and Editors
 The Complete Stories
 The Sons
 The Penal Colony
 The Great Wall of China
 Dearest Father
Bilingual Editions
 The Metamorphosis
 Parables and Paradoxes
 Letter to His Father

Walter Benjamin
 Illuminations
 Reflections

Gershom Scholem
 Major Trends in Jewish Mysticism
 The Messianic Idea in Judaism
 On the Mystical Shape of the Godhead
 On the Kabbalah and its Symbolism
 Zohar: The Book of Splendor

Hannah Arendt
 The Promise of Politics
 The Jewish Writings
 Responsibility and Judgment
 Essays in Understanding, 1930-1954
 The Origins of Totalitarianism

Elie Wiesel
 The Time of the Uprooted
 Somewhere a Master
 Wise Men and Their Tales
 The Judges
 Legends of Our Time
 After the Darkness
 And the Sea Is Never Full
 The Testament
 The Fifth Son
 A Beggar in Jerusalem
 All Rivers Run to the Sea
 The Trial of God
 Twilight
 The Gates of the Forest
 The Town Beyond the Wall
 The Forgotten
 From the Kingdom of Memory
 The Oath
 Rashi

See also
Bücherei des Schocken Verlag
Nahum Norbert Glatzer
Haaretz
 Books in the United States
 Books in Germany

References

External links

A Conversation about Schocken Books - Part I - Katharine McNamara  talks with Altie Karper.
A Conversation about Schocken Books - Part II - Katharine McNamara talks with Susan Ralston.
A Conversation about Schocken Books - Part III - Katharine McNamara  talks with Arthur Samuelson.
  
Schocken Publishing House Ltd. at Database – Jewish Publishers of German Literature in Exile, 1933-1945

Book publishing companies based in New York (state)
Franz Kafka
Jewish German history
Jewish printing and publishing
Publishing companies established in 1931